The Project 75 (India)-class submarines, or P-75I, for short, are a planned class of diesel-electric submarines, which are to be built for the Indian Navy. The P-75I class is a follow-on of the P-75 class submarines of the Indian Navy. Under this project, the Indian Navy intends to acquire six conventional, diesel-electric attack submarines, which will also feature advanced capabilities - including air-independent propulsion (AIP), ISR, special operations forces (SOF), anti-ship warfare (AShW), anti-submarine warfare (ASW), anti-surface warfare (ASuW), land-attack capabilities and other features. All six submarines are expected to be constructed in India, under the Make in India initiative.

History

Origins
In 1997, the Ministry of Defence (MoD) approved a plan to acquire 24 submarines under Project 75. After the Kargil War in 1999, the Cabinet Committee on Security (CCS) - India's top decision-making body on issues related to defense and national security, approved a 30-year submarine building plan, that called for two parallel production lines, each constructing six submarines. The older Project-75 (P-75) was brought under the new plan, with the two production lines to be built under P-75 and P-75I using transfer of technology (ToT) from different foreign manufacturers.

Progress
In 2008, the Indian Navy issued a Request for Information (RFI) to multiple naval conglomerates - Armaris (now Naval Group), HDW and Rosoboronexport for six submarines with air-independent propulsion (AIP) and land-attack capability, that were to be built in India.

In July 2010, the Defence Acquisition Council (DAC) - the MoD's top arms acquisition body, decided to import two submarines, build three at Mazagon Docks Limited (MDL) and one at Hindustan Shipyard Limited (HSL), with a budget of INR . After the project was approved by the DAC in August 2010, an RFI was issued again in September 2010. However, the RFP was not approved by the CCS due to conflicting opinions between the Indian Navy and the MoD, over the involvement of privately-owned shipyards in the project. Consequently, the approval lapsed and was renewed multiple times till 2013.

In October 2014, the DAC decided to construct all six submarines in India and approved a budget of INR . Along with the state-owned MDL, HSL, and Cochin Shipyard Limited (CSL), privately-owned L&T Shipbuilding and Pipavav Shipyard (R-Naval) were allowed to bid for the project in collaboration with a foreign shipyard.

In 2017, the Indian Navy issued another RFI, to Naval Group, Rosoboronexport, ThyssenKrupp Marine Systems (TKMS), Saab Kockums, Navantia and Mitsubishi Heavy Industries (MHI). Out of the aforementioned six - only Naval Group, Rosoboronexport, TKMS and Saab responded, while Navantia and Mitsubishi failed to respond within the deadline.

In June 2017, it was reported that the contract for construction would be awarded under a "Strategic Partnership" (SP) policy, which would eliminate state-owned shipyards from contention. After the approval lapsed in February 2018, the DAC renewed the approval with a budget of INR  in January 2019.

In April 2019, an Expression of Interest (EOI) was issued for six submarines capable of firing land-attack missiles (LAM) and anti-ship cruise missiles. In June 2019, South Korea's Daewoo Shipping & Marine Engineering (DSME), was allowed to enter the project, after the EOI had expired, in response to a late invitation extended by the MoD, thus making a late entrance into the competition. Navantia responded to the EOI in July 2019, affirming the company's re-entrance into the competition (after their absence from the RFI issued in 2017). Shortly after, in September 2019, Saab withdrew from the competition, citing concerns about the rules defined in the "Strategic Partnership" policy. Saab's withdrawal left five firms as the only contestants in P-75I - Naval Group, Rosoboronexport, TKMS, Navantia and DSME; the five firms were later officially shortlisted as the finalists of the competition, in 2020.

Shortlisting
On 21 January 2020, the Government of India (GoI) shortlisted two Indian shipyards - Larsen & Toubro (L&T) and Mazagon Dock Limited (MDL), as the two Indian finalists in P-75I. Concurrently, the GoI also shortlisted five foreign Original Equipment Manufacturers (OEM), as finalists in P-75I - ThyssenKrupp Marine Systems (TKMS) of Germany, Rubin Design Bureau of Russia, Navantia of Spain, Naval Group of France, and Daewoo Shipping & Marine Engineering (DSME) of South Korea. The two Indian shipyards respectively, would have to collaborate with the five foreign shortlisted OEM's, for competing in the project.

On 20 July 2021, the MoD formally issued an RFP for the construction of the six designated submarines, worth , under the "Strategic Partnership" model. Nevertheless, the deadline of the RFP, which was initially scheduled for November 2021, was postponed to June 2022, and later again, to December 2022.

Contenders

Foreign contenders
The five foreign naval conglomerates shortlisted by the MoD in January 2020, were 
   :-  (withdrawn in April 2022)
Naval Group: Offered a diesel-electric variant of the  nuclear attack submarine.
  :-  (withdrawn in August 2021)
ThyssenKrupp Marine Systems: Offered the Type 214 submarine. 
   :- 
Daewoo Shipbuilding and Marine Engineering: Offered a 3000 t variant of the KSS-III submarine, designated as the DSME-3000.
   :-  (withdrawn in February 2022)
   :- 
Navantia: Offered the S-80 Plus submarine.

Local shipyards 
The two Indian shipyards shortlisted by the MoD, were 
  :-
Larsen & Toubro Shipbuilding: Has assisted in the development and construction of the  nuclear-powered ballistic missile submarines, since 2009.
  :-
Mazagon Dock Shipbuilders Limited: Currently manufacturing six Scorpène-class attack submarines, under P-75, of which four have been delivered. Also license manufactured two Type 209/1500 attack submarines, between 1984 and 1994.

Developments

Elimination of contenders
In July 2021, MDL issued an RFI to the five foreign contenders, seeking a partner that has a functional air-independent propulsion (AIP) system that has been tested and proved on operational submarine. Unfortunately, three of the five contenders, namely, France, Russia and Spain, did not possess any functional submarine equipped with a sea-proven AIP system, eliminating them from the competition.  South Korea and Germany were the only nations to have possessed AIP-tested submarines, making them the only qualified competitors in the program.

In August 2021, TKMS withdrew from the program, citing its incapacity to satisfy several technical conditions. The firm highlighted its inability to respond to the tender's short timeline and had disagreed on several technical clauses - specifically on the issues of liability, technology-transfer and proportion of indigenous content. The firm's withdrawal from the competition thus left DSME as the only qualified contender, creating a "single-vendor situation" - a condition in which only one contestant is qualified to participate in a bidding process.

In February 2022, Rosoboronexport withdrew from the tender, citing its inability to comply with the tender's requirements; nevertheless, the firm offered a compensatory deal of new Upgraded Kilo-class submarines, along with decommissioned Original Kilo-class submarines, as an interim option to reinforce the Indian Navy's declining submarine fleet. 

In April 2022, Naval Group withdrew from the tender, citing an inability to comply with its requirements of providing a sea-proven AIP system.

Following the withdrawal of several contenders on account of their respective inabilities to comply with the project's requirements, the MoD postponed the deadline of the tender from November 2021 to June 2022, and later once more, to December 2022.

Gallery

See also
Other References to the Indian Navy
 Submarines of the Indian Navy
 Future of the Indian Navy

References

External links 
 
 Expression of Interest For six P 75(i) Submarines for Indian Navy

Attack submarines
Submarine classes
Submarines of the Indian Navy